Owenodon is a genus of iguanodontian dinosaur known from a partial lower jaw discovered in Early Cretaceous-age rocks of Durlston Bay, Dorset, United Kingdom. The specimen, NHM R2998, comes from the Purbeck Limestone, dating to the middle Berriasian stage (approximately 143 million years ago).  It was first described by Richard Owen, who in 1874 assigned it to Iguanodon as the type specimen of the new species I. hoggii, the specific name honouring naturalist A.J. Hogg who had originally collected the fossil in 1860.  The bone was damaged during initial preparation but was freed from the surrounding rock matrix by an acid bath between 1975 and 1977.  David Norman and Paul Barrett subsequently transferred the species to Camptosaurus in 2002, but this was challenged, and in 2009 Peter Galton assigned the species to the new genus Owenodon, meaning "Owen's tooth", named after Sir Richard Owen. Galton interpreted the genus as an iguanodontoid more derived than Camptosaurus but less derived than Lurdusaurus.

References 

Iguanodonts
Early Cretaceous dinosaurs of Europe
Berriasian life
Cretaceous England
Fossils of England
Fossil taxa described in 2009
Taxa named by Peter Galton
Ornithischian genera